Bernard Newman (18 November 1903 – 30 November 1966) was the head designer for Bergdorf Goodman  and head costume designer for RKO Pictures. He designed costumes for some 35 movies, including costumes for Ginger Rogers, Katharine Hepburn, Lucille Ball and Helen Broderick. He was posthumously included in the Costume Designers Guild Hall of Fame in 2004.

Biography

Bernard Newman was born in Joplin, Missouri in 1903. He studied in Paris and at the Art Student's League. He started working at Bergdorf Goodman, a luxury goods department store in Manhattan, as a window dresser. He later became the head designer for Bergdorf Goodman, and his clothes were worn by film stars like Kay Francis.

Bernard Newman started working as costume designer in the film industry from 1933 on, working mainly for RKO Pictures for the next three years. Newman is best remembered for the costumes he designed for Ginger Rogers in movies like Top Hat and Swing Time. He made a blue dress with ostrich feathers, to Rogers's specification, which she wore in the Cheek to Cheek sequence and which gave her the nickname of Feathers. 15 of his costumes for the 1935 movie Roberta were reproduced and merchandised by the Modern Merchandising Bureau. Other films he worked on include Sylvia Scarlett with Katharine Hepburn and You Can't Take It with You.

Filmography

1933: Rafter Romance
1935: Roberta
1935: Star of Midnight
1935: Break of Hearts
1935: The Nitwits
1935: Top Hat
1935: I Dream Too Much
1935: In Person
1935: Sylvia Scarlet
1935: The Lady Consents
1935: Two in the Dark
1935: Follow the Fleet
1936: The Witness Chair
1936: The Bride Walks Out
1936: Swing Time
1936: Walking on Air
1936: Adventure in Manhattan
1936: Smartest Girl in Town
1936: Theodora Goes Wild
1936: More Than a Secretary
1936: History Is Made at Night
1937: When You're In Love
1937: Vivacious Lady
1938: You Can't Take It with You
1939: Green Hell
1942: Tales of Manhattan
1946: Deception
1946: Humoresque
1947: Possessed
1947: Deep Valley
1947: Dark Passage
1947: Escape Me Never
1947: Hazard
1947: The Woman in White

Notes

External links

1903 births
1966 deaths
American costume designers
American fashion designers